Adriana Farmiga (born July 17, 1974) is an American visual artist, curator, and professor based in New York City. She serves as a programming advisor for the non-profit La Mama Gallery in the East Village, and is the current Associate Dean at Cooper Union School of Art.

Early life
Farmiga was born and raised in a small Ukrainian community in Rosendale, New York. Her paternal first cousins are actresses Vera Farmiga and Taissa Farmiga. She was educated at Cooper Union, graduating with a Bachelor of Fine Arts degree in 1996. Farmiga went on to study at the Milton Avery Graduate School of the Arts at Bard College, where she was taught by the late installation artist Maryanne Amacher; she received her Master of Fine Arts degree from Bard in 2004.

Career
Farmiga began teaching at Temple University's Tyler School of Art and at her alma mater Cooper Union. Additionally, she served as a visiting lecturer at the Rhode Island School of Design in 2013. In October 2017, Farmiga was appointed to the position of Assistant Dean at Cooper Union School of Art.

Farmiga has displayed her artwork at many solo exhibitions, including objects (2001) in New Orleans, 'Scape (2006) in Miami, and Versus (2012) in New York. In 2004, Farmiga was among a group of artists displaying their work in the exhibition The Reality of Things at Triple Candie in Harlem. In 2008, she received the Emerging Artist Fellowship from Socrates Sculpture Park.

In 2011, Farmiga worked as a curator and artist for her cousin Vera Farmiga's directorial debut film Higher Ground. That same year, her work appeared in Thisorganized, a group exhibit curated by painter Hope Gangloff, which was displayed at the Susan Inglett Gallery. In 2013, Farmiga was part of the Screen Play exhibition at the Samuel Dorsky Museum of Art in New Paltz. The following year, she was one of 16 artists chosen, from over 320 applicants, to display her work in the Worlds of Wonder exhibition, also shown at the Samuel Dorsky Museum of Art.

In December 2016, Farmiga's work as part of CIM began showing at the Ukrainian Museum, where it was exhibited until September 2017. From January to February 2017, her work as part of Abandoned Luncheonette was exhibited at the Jeff Bailey Gallery in Hudson, New York. In April 2018, it was announced that Farmiga was one of twelve visual artists whom had been granted a summer fellowship at the MacDowell Colony.

Exhibitions

Solo

Group

References

External links

 
 

1974 births
American women artists
American people of Ukrainian descent
Artists from New York City
Bard College alumni
Cooper Union alumni
Cooper Union faculty
Living people
People from Rosendale, New York
Temple University faculty
MacDowell Colony fellows
American women curators
American curators